Skullfire (Timothy Fitzgerald) is a fictional character appearing in American comic books published by Marvel Comics. The character appeared in the 2099 universe, a look at superheroes in the year 2099. He was one of the founding members of a future incarnation of the X-Men called X-Men 2099.

Fictional character biography
Timothy "Fitz" Fitzgerald was a wealthy, young urban professional until his mutant powers manifested. An uncontrollable burst of energy destroyed his apartment and killed his girlfriend, Reiko. After this, Timothy went into hiding, living on the streets. He was approached by Cerebra, who gave him a card and told him to go to the Nuevo Sol Arcology, in the Nevada desert.

Upon his arrival, Tim was surprised to see other mutants and other genetic outcasts socializing and enjoying themselves. He is introduced to X-Man Serpentina and then their leader Xi'an. However, Tim notices a sniper attempting to assassinate Xi'an. He foils the attempt, but Xi'an is still injured. Tim helps the other X-Men save Xi'an and clear him of charges that he killed a Las Vegas casino mogul, Noah Synge. In the process Serpentina is killed and Tim joins the X-Men, to help create a future where mutants can live free.

Still somewhat shy and unable to fully control his powers, Tim accompanied Krystalin and Meanstreak to New York to find Meanstreak's friend, Jordan Boone, who had disappeared. Along the way, they are captured by La Lunatica and Controller Thirteen of the Theatre of Pain. Luna's powers force him to relive the memory of when his powers manifested and his girlfriend was killed. This trauma triggers his powers, shorting out the equipment around him and helping them all escape, including Luna who had been a slave of the Theatre for 10 years. This exchange also changed Timothy himself, allowing him full control over his powers and bringing him to terms with his past, making him more assertive, more daring and eventually shaping him into the leader of the X-Men. After finally arriving in New York, Tim and the others find Boone, engineered into the 2099 version of the trickster god Loki, and help to take down the Alchemax created Aesir.

After returning to Xi'an Fitz helped find Mama Hurricane, a member of the underground railroad during the Great Purge of mutants, and then Master Zhao, the leader of the last known team of X-Men. Tim accompanied Xi'an after the latter abandoned the X-Men, a result of Zhao's psychic assault returning Xi'an to his base, amoral persona. While searching for The Driver, on information from Mama Hurricane, they encounter La Lunatica again and she and Tim begin a relationship that would last for the remainder of the comic's run. Tim agrees to help her escape the pursuit of the Theatre of Pain, though he is mostly ineffective against their leader, Brimstone Love, when Love attacks them at the Driver's garage. They are granted reprieve however, when Brimstone leaves instead with Xi'an, who joins the Theatre. Disillusioned by his mentor's defection, Tim returns to the other X-Men, with Luna, to reform the team and lead them against the Theatre of Pain.  Together they storm the Theatre's Floodgate facility in California, fighting to a stalemate and forcing Brimstone Love to retreat.  As Floodgate empties, Doom, self-imposed U.S. President, arrives and hires the X-Men as the protectorate of Halo City, a new city-state in the southwest, built to be a safe-haven for mutants, degens and other victims of genetic oppression.

The peace was short-lived, however, as the city is almost immediately put under siege by a villain known as the Graverobber, a mutant with the ability to revive the dead as his own zombie army. In order to find the man responsible for disfiguring him, the Graverobber sends the reanimated Serpentina to kill Fitz. She succeeds and Tim is revived by Graverobber, who uses him to control the city's power. The Graverobber is subdued by the X-Men, however this severs his neural connection to his zombies, killing them again. Inexplicably, Fitz is left alive and continues as a member of the X-Men. On their next mission to liberate the mutant Book, Tim finds out that he is now able to not just absorb ambient electrical energy, but mystical energies as well.

As the city begins to flood due to the encroaching Phalanx, a new villain, Vulcann, arrives to take possession of Joaquim, newborn child of Freakshow member Rosa and adopted son of Metalhead. Vulcann is a bloodsmith, with the power to alter body structure and control growth. With his power he destroys Tim's body, apparently killing him once again. However, this triggers a final mutation, reverting him to a being of pure energy. He is approached by another energy being, taking the familiar form of his former girlfriend Reiko.  It invites him to join with a community of similar beings, but he declines and returns to be with Luna, as well as aid the X-Men in escaping to higher ground.

After the series cancellation in issue #35, X-Men was absorbed into the overarching title 2099: World of Tomorrow, however Timothy was not present in this imprint at all, making his fate unknown.
Recently, in Civil War 2099 event (in Spider-Man 2099 vol.3), Timothy returns, along with La Lunatica and Bloodhawk. The X-Men 2099 fought many heroes (including Shakti).

Powers and abilities
Originally, Tim has the ability to absorb all ambient energy particles into his body where he metabolized them in a usable form and then, disperses it as destructive blasts. Skullfire had no control over these powers though and only capable of using it during great stress moments. Cerebra's abilities allowed her to trigger his capabilities at will, but she must make physical contact with him. After La Lunatica made him relive Reiko's death, he can control them now. While helping to free the mutant Book, it is revealed that he could absorb mystical energies. Absorbing the energy from Halo City's nuclear reactors gave Skullfire a permanent power source, but as one side-effect: glowing light-green.

When Skullfire's body was destroyed, he existed as a small sphere of energy. Tim managed to take on a form that resembles his human self. Now, he possesses flight, as well as energy manipulation, but with far more ease and control.

References 

Fictional characters with absorption or parasitic abilities
Fictional characters with energy-manipulation abilities
Fictional characters with nuclear or radiation abilities
Fictional socialites
Marvel Comics mutants
Marvel Comics superheroes
Marvel 2099 characters
Characters created by John Francis Moore (writer)